Pottsville is a city in Pope County, Arkansas, United States. As of the 2020 census the population was 3,140. It is part of the Russellville Micropolitan Statistical Area.

Geography
Pottsville is located at  (35.248856, -93.046820). It is surrounded by Russellville to the west, Atkins to the east, and Crow Mountain to the north.

Demographics

2020 census

As of the 2020 United States census, there were 3,140 people, 1,031 households, and 840 families residing in the city.

2000 census
As of the 2000 census the population stood at 1,271, with 475 households and 372 families in the town. The population density was 169.3 inhabitants per square mile (65.3/km). The racial makeup of the town was 95.67% White, 0.79% Black or African American, 0.71% Native American, 0.79% Asian, 0.16% from other races, and 1.89% from two or more races.  0.55% of the population were Hispanic or Latino of any race.

Of the 475 households 38.1% had children under the age of 18 living with them, 63.4% were married couples living together, 9.1% had a female householder with no husband present, and 21.5% were non-families. 18.1% of households were one person and 8.8% were one person aged 65 or older.  The average household size was 2.68 and the average family size was 3.02.

The age distribution was 26.8% under the age of 18, 7.6% from 18 to 24, 31.2% from 25 to 44, 22.5% from 45 to 64, and 11.9% 65 or older.  The median age was 36 years. For every 100 females, there were 100.2 males.  For every 100 females age 18 and over, there were 99.8 males.

The median household income was $32,841 and the median family income  was $37,763. Males had a median income of $27,237 versus $18,625 for females. The per capita income for the town was $15,066.  About 12.6% of families and 16.7% of the population were below the poverty line, including 27.8% of those under age 18 and 10.0% of those age 65 or over.

References

External links
 City of Pottsville official website
Pottsville High School Web Site 

Cities in Pope County, Arkansas
Cities in Arkansas
Russellville, Arkansas micropolitan area